James Paramore (born c. 1939) is a former American football player, coach, and official. He served as the head football coach at Southwestern College in Winfield, Kansas from 1973 to 1976 and Bethel College in Newton, Kansas from 1977 to 1978, compiling a career college football coaching record of 27–36.

Playing career
Paramore played high school football in Topeka, Kansas and later in college at Baker University in Baldwin City, Kansas.  While at Baker, he was one of the better players in the nation and was in the running for the Associated Press "Little All-American" status, while securing all-conference honors.

Coaching career

Community college
Paramore worked his way into coaching through the community college ranks in Kansas.  He was head football coach at Dodge City Community College in Dodge City, Kansas for the 1967 and 1968 seasons.  At Dodge, his teams posted a losing record of 4–14–1.

Southwestern
Paramore was the 20th head football coach at Southwestern College in Winfield, Kansas and held that position five seasons, from 1972 to 1976, compiling a record of 20–25.

Bethel
After Southwestern, Paramore became the head football coach at Bethel College in Newton, Kansas for two seasons, from 1977 to 1978.  For those two seasons, his teams compiled a record of 7–11.

High school
Paramore has continued to coach during "retirement" by assisting his son, Mike, at the high school level at Perry-Lecompton High School in Perry, Kansas.

Officiating career
Paramore found more success as a game official and was inducted into the Kansas Collegiate Officials Association Hall of Fame in 2002.

Head coaching record

College

References

1930s births
Living people
American football halfbacks
College football officials
Baker Wildcats football players
Bethel Threshers football coaches
Dodge City Conquistadors football coaches
Southwestern Moundbuilders football coaches
High school football coaches in Kansas
Junior college football coaches in the United States